Roger Crawford may refer to:

 Roger Crawford (tennis) (born 1960), American tennis player
 Roger Crawford (politician) (born 1952), member of the Minnesota House of Representatives
 Roger Crawford (activist) (born 1948), author and fathers rights activist